O-class submarine may refer to:

 
 
 
 Several early submarine classes of the Royal Netherlands Navy:
 O 1-class submarine consisting only 
 
 O 6-class submarine consisting only 
 O 7-class submarine consisting only 
 
 
 O 16-class submarine consisting only